Dennis Ray Nelson (born February 9, 1946) is a former professional American football player who played tackle for seven seasons for the Baltimore Colts and the Philadelphia Eagles.

Nelson was a four-year football letter winner at Illinois State University, a first-team Little All-American pick by the Associated Press on offense in 1968, a two-way all-conference tackle, and was drafted in the third round of the 1969 NFL Draft by the Baltimore Colts. He was a starting tackle in four of his six years with the Colts in the NFL, and was a member of the Colts' Super Bowl V winning team. He came out of retirement for one season to play for the Philadelphia Eagles in 1976, and had his jersey retired by ISU on October 10th 1995.

References

1946 births
Living people
People from Kewanee, Illinois
Players of American football from Illinois
American football offensive tackles
Illinois State Redbirds football players
Baltimore Colts players
Philadelphia Eagles players